Hrivňák (and its variants Hrivnák and Hrivnak) is a surname. People with the surname include:

 Gary Hrivnak (born 1951), American football player 
 Jim Hrivnak (born 1968), Canadian ice hockey player
 Jozef Hrivňák (born 1973), Slovak football player
 Lucia Hrivnák Klocová (born 1983), Slovak athlete
 Michal Hrivňák (born 1991), Slovak football player
 Pavol Hrivnák (1931–1995), Slovak politician
 Peter Hrivňák (born 1965), Slovak boxer
 Vladimír Hrivnák (1945–2014), Slovak football player

Slovak-language surnames
Slovak words and phrases